The Enterprise Football League, formerly known as the National Football League or the National First Division Football League, was the highest-ranked football league in the Republic of China (Taiwan). It was governed by the Chinese Taipei Football Association (CTFA) and considered semi-professional. The competition was ended in 2009 following a change in regulations and a merger into the Intercity Football League.

History
The National Football League was founded by the Chinese Taipei Football Association (CTFA) in 1982 after popular interest motivated by  1982 FIFA World Cup. The CTFA planned to include it as part of the annual football season along with the other three cup competitions: Chung Cheng Cup (中正盃), Li Hui-tang Cup (李惠棠盃), and CTFA Cup (足協盃). The first league season featured 7 teams: Flying Camel, Taipei City Bank, Taiwan Power Company, Thunderbird, Lukuang, Taiwan Provincial College of Physical Education, and Taipei Physical Education College.

After 2006, the CTFA changed the name of the league to the Enterprise Football League in an attempt to attract more attention and financial support from successful Taiwanese enterprises. Fubon Financial became the major sponsor, and therefore the league was also known as the Fubon Enterprise Football League. The number of teams participating in the league was also reduced from eight to four by excluding college and high school teams in an attempt to make the league more professional. Nevertheless, there are currently only two semi-professional clubs remaining: Tatung F.C. and Taiwan Power Company F.C.

In November 2007, the CTFA announced that they would not hold further Enterprise Football League seasons after 2009. The Intercity Football League replaced the Enterprise Football League to become the top-ranked league in Taiwan.

Teams 

* Not a club team.

Results

Performance by team

Promotions and relegations

See also
 Chinese Taipei Football Association
 Sport in Taiwan

Notes and references

External links
 Chinese Taipei Football Association official website 
 Results at RSSSF

 
Sports leagues established in 1982
Sports leagues disestablished in 2009
Taiwan
1982 establishments in Taiwan

fr:Championnat de Taïwan de football
it:Campionato di calcio taiwanese